Oberleutnant Franz Schleiff (born 19 September 1896, date of death unknown) was a World War I flying ace credited with twelve aerial victories. Nine additional combat claims went uncredited.

Aerial service

Russia and Palestine
Schlieff joined German aviation in July 1915. After training at FEA 9 in Darmstadt, he was assigned to FA 54, an artillery cooperation unit operating on the Eastern Front. From there, he was transferred to FA 300 in Palestine. On 11 May 1917, he shot down a Martinsyde Elephant over Beersheba. He scored again, on 25 June, but failed to get confirmation when he forced an enemy fighter to land on the 29th. For his efforts, Schlieff was decorated by the Turkish government.

France
His next move took him to the Western Front, to Jagdstaffel 41, in October 1917. He scored once for them, on 6 December 1917. On 9 January 1918, he was promoted to command of Jagdstaffel 56. Beginning 19 February, and running through 24 March, he tallied nine more confirmed victories, and an unconfirmed one. On 26 March, he received the Royal House Order of Hohenzollern. On 27 March, he was wounded in the hand by a tracer bullet, and the hand had to be amputated. This ended Schlieff's flying career.

Schlieff claimed 12 victories and was nominated for the Pour le Merite, but did not receive it.

Sources of information

References
Above the Lines: The Aces and Fighter Units of the German Air Service, Naval Air Service and Flanders Marine Corps 1914 - 1918 Norman L. R. Franks, et al. Grub Street, 1993. , .

1896 births
Year of death missing
People from Sztum County
People from West Prussia
Recipients of the Imtiyaz Medal
Recipients of the Liakat Medal
German World War I flying aces
Luftstreitkräfte personnel
Prussian Army personnel
German amputees